William Beech (1898–1971) was a Canadian politician.

William Beech may also refer to:
 William Beeche ( 1386), English MP
 William Beech, character in Goodnight Mister Tom (film)
 William Beech, character in Innocent (TV series)
 William Beech of Beech's periscope rifle

See also
 William Beach (disambiguation)